Kendall County is a county in the U.S. state of Illinois, within the Chicago metropolitan area. According to the 2020 census, it has a population of 131,869. Its county seat is Yorkville, and its most populous municipality is Oswego.

Kendall County is part of the Chicago metropolitan area and was the fastest-growing county in the United States between 2000 and 2010.

History
Kendall County was formed in 1841 out of LaSalle and Kane Counties.

The county is named after Amos Kendall, who was the editor of the Frankfort, Kentucky, newspaper, and went on to be an important advisor to President Andrew Jackson. Kendall became the U.S. Postmaster General in 1835.

Geography 

Kendall County is a small but rapidly growing county that has the majority of its population in the northeast and along the Fox River (the only river in the county), which runs through the county's northwestern section. Many new subdivisions have been constructed in this county, which has produced considerable population growth. Southern Kendall still remains largely agricultural. Kendall County has two primary ranges of low-lying hills formed by what is known as an end moraine. Ransom, the more predominant of the two moraines, runs through the west and north-central part of the county. Minooka, the other major end moraine ridge in Kendall County, runs along its entire eastern border with Will County. The two moraines intersect at almost a right angle in the township of Oswego. The county's only designated state park is Silver Springs State Fish and Wildlife Area.

Climate and weather

Major highways
  Interstate 80
  U.S. Highway 30
  U.S. Highway 34
  U.S. Highway 52
  Illinois Route 25
  Illinois Route 31
  Illinois Route 47
  Illinois Route 71
  Illinois Route 126

Adjacent counties
 DeKalb County - northwest
 Kane County - north
 DuPage County - northeast
 Will County - east
 Grundy County - south
 LaSalle County - west

Demographics

As of the 2010 United States Census,  114,736 people, 38,022 households, and 30,067 families were residing in the county. The 40,321 housing units averaged . The racial makeup of the county was 83.6% White, 5.7% African American, 3.0% Asian, 0.3% Native American, 5.0% from other races, and 2.3% from two or more races. Those of Hispanic or Latino origin made up 15.6% of the population. In terms of ancestry, 28.0% were German, 16.0% were Irish, 9.5% were Polish, 9.4% were Italian, 7.5% were English, and 3.2% were American.

Of the 38,022 households, 47.9% had children under the age of 18 living with them, 65.8% were married couples living together, 9.2% had a female householder with no husband present, 20.9% were not families, and 16.4% of all households were made up of individuals. The average household size was 3.01, and the average family size was 3.41. The median age was 32.9 years.

The county's median household income was $79,897, and its median family income was $87,309. Males had a median income of $64,048 versus $42,679 for females. The county's per capita income was $30,565. About 2.9% of families and 3.9% of the population were below the poverty line, including 4.6% of those under age 18 and 3.4% of those age 65 or over.

Kendall County was listed as the fastest-growing county in the US from 2000 to 2009, experiencing a population growth rate of 110.4% in this period. The reason for this growth is heavy suburbanization from the metropolitan Chicago area.

Communities

Cities
 Aurora (part)
 Joliet (part)
 Plano
 Sandwich (part)
 Yorkville (mostly)

Villages

 Lisbon
 Millbrook
 Millington (mostly)
 Minooka (mostly)
 Montgomery (part)
 Newark
 Oswego
 Plainfield (part)
 Plattville

Census-designated place
 Boulder Hill

Other unincorporated communities
 Ament Corners
 Bristol
 Fox
 Helmar
 Little Rock

Townships
The county is an  square, which is divided up into 9 townships. Each township is divided into 36 one-mile-square sections, except that the Fox River is used as a township border, resulting in Bristol being the smallest township with the extra area being assigned to Oswego and Kendall Townships. Two exceptions to the section grid reflect Indian land grants under the Treaty of Prairie du Chien in 1829: the Mo-Ah-Way Reservation in Oswego Township and the Waish-Kee-shaw Reservation in Na-Au-Say Township. These areas were eventually sold to European settlers.

 Big Grove Township
 Bristol Township
 Fox Township
 Kendall Township
 Lisbon Township
 Little Rock Township
 Na-au-say Township
 Oswego Township
 Seward Township

Government
County board members run in two districts. All other officers run county-wide:
 County Board Members: Judy Gilmour, Scott Gengler, Brian Debolt, Elizabeth Flowers, Robyn Vickers, Amy Cesich, Scott R. Gryder, Matt Kellogg, Dan Koukol;
 County Board Chairman – Scott R. Gryder
 Forest Preserve President – Judy Gilmour
 Clerk of the Circuit Court – Matthew G. Prochaska
 Coroner – Jacquie Purcell
 County Clerk and Recorder – Debbie Gillette
 Sheriff – Dwight Baird
 State's Attorney – Eric Weis
 Treasurer – Jill Ferko

Politics

For years, Kendall County was one of the most Republican counties in Illinois. Between the 1856 and 2004 elections, the only time Kendall County did not give a plurality to the GOP Presidential nominee was in 1912, when the Republican Party was mortally divided and Progressive Party candidate Theodore Roosevelt won 57.56% of the county's vote against conservative incumbent President  William Howard Taft. Moreover, only one Democratic Presidential candidate – Franklin Delano Roosevelt in 1932 and 1936 – ever cracked 40% of Kendall County's vote during this span of 38 presidential elections. As a measure of how Republican the county was at the time, it gave Barry Goldwater 62 percent of the vote, his strongest showing in the state, even as Lyndon Johnson won the state and the nation in a landslide.

In 2008, Illinois native Barack Obama became the first Democrat to carry the county since Franklin Pierce in 1852. Obama did not repeat this feat against Mitt Romney in 2012, nor did Democrat Hillary Clinton defeat Donald Trump in 2016. Joe Biden won the county in the 2020 United States Presidential election.

Kendall County is one of only thirteen counties to have voted for Obama in 2008, Romney in 2012, Trump in 2016, and Biden in 2020.

Property values 
Kendall County was the fastest growing county in the US, more than doubling in population between the 2000 and 2010 censuses.

All five Kendall County communities analyzed saw their real home prices fall dramatically from 2007 to 2015, from a low of 17 percent in Montgomery to a high of 44 percent in Plano. Minooka and Oswego both saw their home values fall 34 percent. In Yorkville, they fell 36 percent.

Education
 Lisbon Community Consolidated School District 90
 Newark Community Consolidated School District 66
 Newark Community High School District 18
 Oswego Community Unit School District 308
 Plano Community Unit School District 88
 Yorkville Community Unit School District 115
 School District #101
 School District #201
 School District #202
 School District #429
 School District #430 (Sandwich Community School District #430)

The northern half of the county is in Community College District 516 and is served by Waubonsee Community College in Sugar Grove, Aurora, and Plano. The southern half is in Community College District 525 and is served by Joliet Junior College in Joliet.

In popular culture
Locations within and around the City of Plano were stand-ins for Clark Kent's hometown of Smallville, Kansas, in the 2013 film Man of Steel as well as the 2016 film Batman v. Superman: Dawn of Justice. Plano has also been used in the film Witless Protection, with both films having been filmed in Plano's historic downtown area.  Filming has also taken place south of Plano at the Farnsworth House, a modern architectural landmark for documentaries and commercials.

See also
 National Register of Historic Places listings in Kendall County, Illinois

Notes

References
Specific

General

External links
 Official website

 
Illinois counties
1841 establishments in Illinois
Populated places established in 1841
Chicago metropolitan area